Mavro "Moše" Frankfurter (1875–1942) was a Croatian rabbi from Vinkovci who was murdered during the Holocaust at the Jasenovac concentration camp.

Moshe (Moritz) Frankfurter was born in Holešov, Czech Republic (then part of Austria-Hungary) on 15 May 1875 to David and Katerina Frankfurter. He was married to Rebekka-Rivka Figel, with whom he had three children: daughter Ruth and two sons, David and Alfons (later Avraham). Frankfurter family lived in Daruvar where Frankfurter was a rabbi. On the eve of World War I he moved with his family to Vinkovci where he was appointed as rabbi, and later in 1914 as Chief rabbi. Frankfurter was fluent in German, Polish, Hebrew and Croatian. In the Frankfurter household German and Hebrew was spoken. During the construction of Nova ulica (New street) in Vinkovci, Frankfurter built a family mansion (now Juraj Dalmatinac Street and Vladimir Nazor Street). From 1914 to 1941, in addition to the regular activities at the Jewish community of Vinkovci and Vinkovci Synagogue, Frankfurter worked as a Judaism teacher at the Vinkovci Gymnasium. In 1936 his son David assassinated Swiss branch leader of the German NSDAP Wilhelm Gustloff in Davos, Switzerland. Frankfurter's hair turned grey overnight when he heard of the assassination. He visited his son in prison and asked him "... who actually needed this?" During the World War II and the Nazi occupation of Vinkovci in 1941, Frankfurter was made to stand on a table while the German soldiers spat in his face, pulled out the hair from his long beard, and struck him with their rifle butts. Frankfurter and his wife were murdered in 1942 by the Ustashas at the Jasenovac concentration camp.

References

Bibliography

 
 

1875 births
1942 deaths
People from Holešov
People from Vinkovci
Croatian Jews who died in the Holocaust
Austro-Hungarian rabbis
Croatian Austro-Hungarians
Croatian people of Czech-Jewish descent
20th-century Croatian rabbis
Modern Orthodox rabbis
Croatian civilians killed in World War II
People who died in Jasenovac concentration camp
Czech people executed in Nazi concentration camps
Croatian people executed in Nazi concentration camps